Northern Cambria is a borough in Cambria County, Pennsylvania, United States. It is part of the Johnstown, Pennsylvania Metropolitan Statistical Area. The population was 3,835 at the 2010 census.

History
The borough of Northern Cambria was incorporated on January 1, 2000. It was formed from the merger of two smaller municipalities, Barnesboro and Spangler.  The merger proposal was taken to residents in the 1997 election, passing in Spangler 410-243 and in Barnesboro 466-324. The area was first settled by Europeans in the early-to-middle 19th century. The presence of the West Branch of the Susquehanna River allowed loggers to move their harvest downstream. Small farms developed, but the area changed in the 1890s when mining of the extensive bituminous coal fields in the area became the dominant industry. The mining companies required skilled workers, and many came from Great Britain and Eastern Europe. Railroads were built to transport the coal out, and the town flourished with the influx of money. In the 1980s, the coal industry began a decline, and there has been a subsequent decline in the population of the area. In November 1922, the Reilly Shaft No. 1 mine explosion occurred, killing 78 coal miners.

A pumpkin weighing  was grown by resident Larry Checkon in 2005 (a world record at that time).

Geography 
Northern Cambria is located near the northwest corner of Cambria County at  (40.655813, -78.779472), in the valley of the West Branch of the Susquehanna River, near its headwaters. U.S. Route 219 passes through the borough, leading south  to Ebensburg, the county seat, and north  to DuBois.

Education
The local public school district is the Northern Cambria School District. The district has two schools located in the borough of Northern Cambria. The Northern Cambria Elementary/Middle School serves students in grades Pre-K to 8 while the Northern Cambria High School serves students in grades 9 to 12. Surrounding public school districts include:
 Cambria Heights School District
 Central Cambria School District
 Blacklick Valley School District
 Penns Manor School District
 Purchase Line School District
 Harmony Area School District

Students in grades K-8 can also attend the private Northern Cambria Catholic School in Nicktown,  to the south. Some students in grades 9-12 attend the private Bishop Carroll High School in Ebensburg.

Nearby colleges include Mount Aloysius College (Cresson), Saint Francis University (Loretto), Indiana University of Pennsylvania (Indiana), the University of Pittsburgh at Johnstown, Penn State Altoona, and Pennsylvania Highlands Community College (near Johnstown).

Demographics

As of the census of 2019, there were 3,588 people, 1,763 households, and 1,191 families residing in the borough. The population density was 1,401.9 people per square mile (540.4/km²). There were 1,954 housing units at an average density of 652.4 per square mile (251.5/km²). The racial makeup of the borough was 99.31% White, 0.07% African American, 0.10% Native American, 0.24% Asian, 0.02% Pacific Islander, 0.10% from other races, and 0.17% from two or more races. Hispanic or Latino of any race were 0.31% of the population.

There were 1,763 households, out of which 28.1% had children under the age of 18 living with them, 51.3% were married couples living together, 11.9% had a female householder with no husband present, and 32.4% were non-families. 29.3% of all households were made up of individuals, and 17.7% had someone living alone who was 65 years of age or older. The average household size was 2.37 and the average family size was 2.92.

In the borough the population was spread out, with 22.0% under the age of 18, 8.3% from 18 to 24, 26.0% from 25 to 44, 22.5% from 45 to 64, and 21.2% who were 65 years of age or older. The median age was 41 years. For every 100 females there were 89.8 males. For every 100 females age 18 and over, there were 86.0 males.

The median income for a household in the borough was $24,655, and the median income for a family was $29,917. Males had a median income of $27,214 versus $17,546 for females. The per capita income for the borough was $13,129. About 15.4% of families and 17.7% of the population were below the poverty line, including 29.1% of those under age 18 and 7.4% of those age 65 or over.

Notable people 

 Frank Brazill, baseball player. Born in Spangler, now Northern Cambria.
 Chris Columbus, director of Home Alone , Mrs. Doubtfire, and the first two Harry Potter movies. Born in Spangler, now Northern Cambria.
 Duffy Daugherty, athletic fields named after and top historical football coach in Barnesboro, now Northern Cambria Hall of Fame noted.
 Jennifer Haigh, novelist. Born in Barnesboro, now Northern Cambria.
 George Magulick, player in the National Football League in 1944. Born in Spangler, now Northern Cambria.
 Joe Maross, actor. Born in Barnesboro, now Northern Cambria.
 Nicola Paone, singer and songwriter. Born in Barnesboro, now Northern Cambria.
 Cheryl Strayed, memoirist, novelist and essayist portrayed by Reese Witherspoon in the film Wild. Born in Spangler, now Northern Cambria.
 J. Irving Whalley, Republican member of the U.S. House of Representatives from Pennsylvania. Born in Barnesboro, now Northern Cambria. 
 David Wilkerson, pastor. Born in Barnesboro, now Northern Cambria.

Media
Three daily newspapers cover the Northern Cambria borough: the Altoona Mirror, the Johnstown Tribune-Democrat, and the Indiana Gazette. 950 WNCC was the town's radio station since 1950.  The station went off the air in 2010. The local NBC affiliate is WJAC-6, the local CBS affiliate is WTAJ-10, the local ABC affiliate is WATM-23, the local PBS station is WPSU-3, and the local Fox affiliate is WWCP-8. Comcast is the cable provider for the borough.

References

External links
 Northern Cambria Borough official website
 Northern Cambria community website

Populated places established in 1893
Boroughs in Cambria County, Pennsylvania
2000 establishments in Pennsylvania